Adventures of Serial Buddies is a 2011 black comedy film written and directed by Keven Undergaro.

Synopsis
Gregory is a Catholic who is determined to rid the world of evil people, Gary assembles trophies and wants to kill possible trophy winners, Graham serves as Gary's understudy and will stop at nothing to become a trophy maker himself, while Vinny Van Go has an affinity for visiting accident scenes with the purpose of making friends. These idiots are forced to join forces and embark on a riotous road trip journey—which crosses paths with everything from skinheads and frat jocks to bikers and babes. And don't forget about the clowns!

Cast
Henry Winkler as the Narrator
Christopher Lloyd as Dr. Von Gearheart
Beth Behrs as Brittany   
Christopher McDonald as Father Christopher
Maria Menounos as Katelyn 
Kathie Lee Gifford as Kathie Lee Gifford 
Artie Lange as Golden Graham 
David Proval as Big Chicken 
Cassidy Gifford as Hannah 
Gheorghe Muresan as Paul of the Shed
Richard Christy as Skinhead leader 
Paul Ashton as Gregory
Hal Rudnick as Gary
Gian Molina as Vinny
Todd Wilson as Graham
John Comerford as Garth / Lil Bozo / Ron A Roll

Production
The idea for the film was inspired by a man director Undergaro was friends with, who unknowingly turned out to be a sociopath. Shooting was completed in a brisk four-week span, and the film  is known for discovering actress Beth Behrs before landing her breakout role on CBS' 2 Broke Girls.

It is also credited with being the first "serial killer buddy comedy".

Reception
John Campea of Collider Movie News has described the film as "Dexter meets Dumb and Dumber."

Critic Scott Mantz has called the film "seriously funny. Wacky twisted fun." And entertainment journalist Ben Lyons has said the film is a "fearless farce for fans of funny."

References

External links 

2011 films
American buddy comedy films
American independent films
2010s buddy comedy films
2011 black comedy films
American black comedy films
2010s English-language films
2010s American films